"Bacon" is a song recorded by American singer Nick Jonas, featuring guest vocals from singer Ty Dolla $ign. It was released on July 12, 2016, as the second single from Jonas' third studio album, Last Year Was Complicated. The song was written by Jonas, Priscilla Renea, Tyrone Griffin, Jr. and Nolan Lambroza. "Bacon" was nominated for the 2016 MTV Video Music Awards for the category Song of Summer. It was the second consecutive year that Jonas was nominated for the award.

Background and release
On March 24, 2016, Jonas announced the song as part of the track list for his new album. In March, it was revealed that singer Ty Dolla $ign had a feature on the record. According to Jonas the song is about when you are out of a relationship and you start to be okay with the fact that it's ended, saying "In my case my life was great, it’s so good that we should throw some bacon on it to make it even better". The track premiered on June 3, 2016, and was sent to US rhythmic radio on July 12, 2016, as the album's second single, replacing "Chainsaw", which had originally been confirmed for the position.

Critical reception

Kaitlyn Tiffany of The Verge compared the song to "Lucozade" to Zayn Malik and wrote that Ty Dolla $ign's verse is "explicitly about sex, but doesn't have anything to do with bacon". Kristie Rohwedder from Bustle wrote that the song is "another reason to be stoked" for the album. Idolator's Rachel Sonis called the song "super weird", saying that "I don’t get this one". Eddie Fu from Uproxx called it a "grown and sexy R&B track", also writing that "Ty Dolla $ign has shown he’s adept at working with pop acts in the past... and the R&B singer has delivered once again". Brianna Wiest of Teen Vogue called it a "super catchy, upbeat song" that "may seem like your average, everyday, low-key newly-single anthem".

Composition
"Bacon" is composed in the key of A# Minor. The verse, pre-chorus and chorus are sung by Jonas, while Ty Dolla $ign raps during the song's bridge.

Music video
A music video of the song was released on Tidal on June 6, 2016, with a 30-second teaser available to non-subscribers. The music video was filmed in New Orleans and is set in the vintage diner Ted's Frostop. It features Nick dancing with friends and eating bacon. Meanwhile, Ty Dolla $ign makes a cameo in a music video setting, complete with models and lowriders. On June 10, 2016, the music video was uploaded on Jonas' Vevo channel. Chord Overstreet of Jonas's Safehouse Records label also appears in the video.

Commercial performance 
The song reached the top 40 on the Mainstream Top 40 chart at number 37 and the Rhythmic Songs chart at number 35, becoming his first single to miss the top 30 on both charts. The song failed to enter the Billboard Hot 100 but reached number 20 on the Bubbling Under Hot 100 Singles chart.

Live performance
On April 24, 2016, Jonas performed "Bacon" during his set at the New Orleans Jazz Festival. On June 10, 2016, he performed the songs on Today. On August 28, 2016, Jonas and Ty performed the song at the MTV Video Music Awards. On September 20, 2016, he performed the song solo on The Late Late Show with James Corden. The song is also part of the set list of his Future Now Tour.

Track listing
Digital download – remixes
"Bacon"  – 4:08

Charts

Release history

Notes

References

External links
 

2016 singles
2016 songs
Nick Jonas songs
Ty Dolla Sign songs
Island Records singles
Safehouse Records singles
Songs written by Sir Nolan
Songs written by Nick Jonas
Songs written by Ty Dolla Sign
Songs written by Muni Long